Biwajima Sports Center is an arena in Nagoya, Aichi, Japan. It is the home arena of the Toyotsu Fighting Eagles Nagoya of the B.League, Japan's professional basketball league.

References

Basketball venues in Japan
Indoor arenas in Japan
Sports venues in Nagoya
Toyotsu Fighting Eagles Nagoya
Sports venues completed in 1987
1987 establishments in Japan
Nishi-ku, Nagoya